Hemei Township is an urban township in northwestern Changhua County, Taiwan. It is bordered by the Dadu River to the north, Shengang and Xianxi to the west, Lukang and Xiushui to the south, and Changhua City to the east.

History
An early name for the area that is now Hemei was Khah-lí-siān, taken from the aboriginal Babuza language.  It was late named Hô-bí-sòaⁿ.  The shortened name Hemei became official with the formation of Hemei (Wabi) Village on 1 October 1920 under Japanese rule.

Geography
Hemei encompasses 39.93 square kilometers and a population of 88,740, including 45,035 males and 43,705 females (January 2023).

Administrative divisions
The township comprises 32 villages, which are Daxia, Detan, Ganjing, Haishe, Haoxiu, Hebei, Henan, Hetung, Hexi, Hunei, Jiabao, Jiali, Licheng, Mianqian, Nandian, Renai, Shanli, Sizhang, Tangyou, Tieshan, Touqian, Tucuo, Xinzhuang, Yagou, Yuanbei, Yuemei, Zengping, Zhaoan, Zhongliao, Zhongwei, Zhuying and Zhuyuan.

Tourist attractions
Daodong Tutorial Academy, a former tutorial academy during the Qing Dynasty and now a tourist attraction, is located in on Heqing Road in Hemei proper.

Transportation
In 2017, Changhua County Magistrate Wei Ming-gu announced intentions to have the Taichung Metro's Green Line extend beyond Changhua City to area such as Hemei.

Notable natives
 Yao Chia-wen, President of Examination Yuan (2002–2008)

References

External links